Beihai Fucheng Airport  is an airport serving the city of Beihai in Guangxi Zhuang Autonomous Region, China. It serves primarily domestic destinations within China, with limited international service. In 2011 it ranked as the 63rd busiest airport in China, in terms of passengers.

Airlines and destinations

See also
List of airports in China
List of the busiest airports in China

References

External links
Beihai Fucheng Airport (BHY), China

Airports in Guangxi
Beihai